Hojai District was a district in Assam, India. It was formed on 15 August 2015. The headquarters of the district is situated at Sankardev Nagar, which is about 8 km away from Hojai town. Hojai District was formed from three tehsils of Nagaon District, namely Hojai, Doboka and Lanka. Hojai was a part of undivided Nowgong district (now Nagaon) of then Assam Province. 

On 31 December 2022, the district was remerged temporarily into Nagaon district.

Etymology
Hojai is a surname commonly used by the Dimasa community.

History 
The geographical area presently under Hojai district and its surrounding area as in the history of the ancient Kamarupa, was known as Davaka kingdom or Kapili Valley kingdom. In different sources this kingdom is mentioned as ‘Dabak’, ‘Kapili’ and ‘Tribeg’.  This kingdom enjoyed independent status up to the 6th century CE.

Medieval historical sources mention that during the reign of Kashyap (1365-1400) of the Barahi Pala dynasty there began a new era of Kachari supremacy in the Kapili-Jamuna valley.  Birochana, a minister of Kachari origin in the service of king Bhoumapala of Behali area in the north bank of Brahmaputra had to flee his kingdom after a conflict with the king and came to the south bank of Brahmaputra and established a new kingdom on the banks of the Kalong river which was Brahmapur or the present day Batampur and he assumed the name ‘Bicharpatipha’. Soon Kachari reign spread to the entire Kapili-Jamuna valley and the name of the kingdom was known as Kacharipar.

Due to Ahoms kingdom's vigorous territorial expansion, the Kachari kings came in to conflict with them. During the rule of Kachari king Tamradhwaja Narayan the Kachari ruled areas went to the Ahoms under Swargadeo Gadadhar Singha.

The word ‘Hojai’ is of Dimasa origin. Even now Hojai area has a sizeable population of Dimasas and some of them have the surname ‘Hojai’.

In the modern day, Hojai saw a large influx of Sylheti Hindu refugees after Sylhet went to Pakistan. In 1993, the Hojai riots broke out between Hindus and Muslims over tensions related to the Babri Masjid demolition.

Demographics

According to the Indian Census of 2011, the three tehsils in the newly formed Hojai District had a population of 931,218 in 2011. Among those 499,565 are Muslim and 424,065 are Hindu, constitutuing 53.65% and 45.53% of district population respectively, while Christians are 5,081. Scheduled Castes and Scheduled Tribes make up 109,437 (11.75%) and 28,731 (3.09%) respectively.

After Sylhet referendum which led to separation of Sylhet division from then Assam Province, a large number of Bengali Hindus have migrated to the area from the then East Pakistan and are mostly settled in the towns such as Lumding, Lanka and Hojai.

At the time of the 2011 census, 62.67% of the population spoke Bengali, 23.72% Assamese, 4.31% Hindi, 1.91% Meitei, 1.31% Boro and 1.21% Bhojpuri as their first language.

Politics
Hojai district has three assembly constituencies. They are Jamunamukh, Hojai and Lumding. Hojai district is also part of Nowgong constituency.

Judiciary

Judicial Court at Hojai was established on 20th October, 1982 and functioning as Court of Judicial Magistrate First Class. The Courts of Additional District and Sessions Judge(Fast Track Court),Sub-Divisional Judicial Magistrate, Munsiff cum JMFC Courts were later added under District Judiciary,Nagaon.

On 6th of March, 2021, Hon'ble Mr. Justice Suman Shyam, Judge Guahati High Court, inaugurated the Newly created Courts of District & Sessions Judge and Chief Judicial Magistrate at Hojai, Sankardev Nagar. Sri Aditya Hazarika became the first District & Sessions Judge and Sri Shakti Sharma became the first Chief Judicial Magistrate of Hojai District.

See also
Hojai
Dabaka
Lanka

References

External links
 Official website

 
Populated places established in 2015
Districts of Assam
Minority Concentrated Districts in India
2015 establishments in Assam